Miguxês ( or ), also known in Portugal as pita talk or pita script (pronounced ), is an Internet slang of the Portuguese language, commonly used by mostly Brazilian teenagers on the Internet and other electronic media, such as messages written on cell phones.

Brief history

It also tends to have "simpler" orthography in comparison to standard Portuguese orthography, which leads to the most strong criticism to it ( without its common alternative spellings is associated with the just normal Internet and/or youth slang).

There are identitarian and orthographic differences between the so-called leetspeak,  and  — Brazilian Portuguese for netspeak, which is by far the one that most closely resembles standard Portuguese —, all common sociolects found in the Portuguese-speaking digital network community, the three latter ones created in it.

Basically, the use of each category depends on the individual choice and the environment in which people are interacting. While in the Internet, in a general manner, there is a handful of a different phenomenon in which users communicate with abbreviations to simplify writing,  carries with it an effective intention, that is, to express an infantile language in a conversation between friends, or even satirize this style of communication. In certain subcultures in Brazil, especially in the case of what is called 'emo' there,  is an item of group identification.

Together with the cited urban tribes, they started to fall out of the mainstream in the early 2010s, so that they have much lower popularity with the following teen generation that did not see its spreading as a frequent Internet meme.

Spelling

Although orthography rules of  may vary individually, and also in each region and in different urban tribes since it is plain broken Portuguese, there are certain characteristics often commonly found as:

 Replacement of s and c for x, simulating the palatalization of native Portuguese-speaking children's speech through their language acquisition: você (Second person singular),  (Second person plural) > vuxeh, vuxeix;
 Omission or replacement of diacritics, notably by replacing an acute accent over a vowel with the letter h after the vowel as in é ("is") > eh (to distinguish it from the word e meaning "and") or será ("will be") > serah. Or replacing the tilde with n/m to indicate nasalization: não ("no") > nawn/naum
 Replacement of i by ee, influenced by English language orthography:  (female kitten, also a slang for pretty girl) > gateenha;
 Replacement of o and e by u and i respectively, specially in non-tonic syllables:  (I want) > keru.
 Replacing the digraph qu and the letter c as k both for brevity and as a form of sensational spelling, and deleting the u of these environments:  (who),  (wrote) > kem, ixkrevew

Tiopês

Example

 
Rough colloquial Portuguese translation of the  piece
 
 English, literal translation of the Portuguese piece
 You guys, I [have to tell that I] absolutely love/adore Uncyclopedia, hahahaha, their [Portuguese] article on us indie kids is awesome, but I have something to say [to you], not every parody site is cool, some of them promote controversial things such as [a number of] prejudices, and I am reticent of [all] this kind of thing, a good example would be a so-called Encyclopedia Dramatica that in spite of its name, would not be worth of a drama because of its end.

See also
 SMS language
 Cyberculture
 Internet meme

References

 (in Brazilian Portuguese) 
  
  "O jeito certo de falar errado na internet", The right way to misspell on the internet - O Estado de S. Paulo, 21/4/2008

Internet slang
Computer-mediated communication
Internet memes
Cant languages